Charles Forrest Whitley (born September 15, 1997) is an American professional baseball pitcher for the Houston Astros of Major League Baseball (MLB).

Career

Amateur career
Whitley attended Alamo Heights High School in San Antonio, Texas. In the summer prior to his senior year he was a member of the 18U National Team that won the World Cup. Whitley threw a no-hitter with 14 strikeouts in a game during his senior year.

Professional career
The Houston Astros selected Whitley in the first round, with the 17th overall selection, in the 2016 Major League Baseball draft. He was committed to Florida State University to play college baseball, but instead decided to sign with the Astros. He was assigned on July 13, 2016 to the Gulf Coast Astros of the Rookie-level Gulf Coast League, and was later promoted to the Greeneville Astros of the Rookie-level Appalachian League. In  innings pitched between both teams, he posted a 1-2 record and a 4.82 earned run average (ERA).

Whitley began the 2017 season with the Quad Cities River Bandits of the Single-A Midwest League and received promotions to the Buies Creek Astros of the High-A Carolina League in July, and to the Corpus Christi Hooks of the Double-A Texas League in August. In 23 total games (18 starts) between the three teams, he pitched to a combined 5-4 record and 2.83 ERA with 143 strikeouts in  innings pitched.

On February 21, 2018, Whitley was suspended 50 games for violating MLB's drug prevention and treatment program. He recorded a 3.76 ERA in 8 starts for Corpus Christi that season. The Astros invited Whitley to spring training in 2019, and he began the season with the Round Rock Express of the Class AAA Pacific Coast League. He was selected to play in the Arizona Fall League for the Peoria Javelinas following the season.

The Astros added Whitley to their 40-man roster after the 2020 season.  On March 10, 2021, it was announced that Whitley would undergo ulnar collateral ligament reconstruction, more commonly known as Tommy John surgery, and miss the 2021 season as a result.

Whitley began a rehabilitation assignment on June 16, 2022 with the Florida Complex League (FCL) Astros.  He delivered 38 pitches across two innings, allowed three runs and averaged  on his fastball versus the FCL Nationals.  It was his first competition in professional baseball since September 2, 2019. He ended the season appearing in a total of 13 games split between the FCL Astros, Single-A Fayetteville Woodpeckers, and Triple-A Sugar Land Space Cowboys, posting a cumulative 0-2 record and 6.53 ERA with 45 strikeouts in 40.0 innings pitched.

Whitley was optioned to Triple-A Sugar Land to begin the 2023 season.

See also

 List of people from San Antonio

References

External links

1997 births
Living people
Baseball players from San Antonio
Baseball pitchers
Gulf Coast Astros players
Greeneville Astros players
Quad Cities River Bandits players
Buies Creek Astros players
Fayetteville Woodpeckers players
Corpus Christi Hooks players
Round Rock Express players
Sugar Land Space Cowboys players
Scottsdale Scorpions players
Peoria Javelinas players